Festivals in Aruba take place throughout the year on the island. Many of these cultural events are known internationally and draw tourists from around the globe. The island waived COVID-19 testing requirements to increase the number of visitors.

Aruba Summer Music Festival
The Aruba Summer Music Festival is a Latin music festival. It is celebrated at the end of June every year and lasts for 2 days.

Bon Bini Festival
The Bon Bini Festival takes place in Fort Zoutman, Oranjestad every Tuesday from 6:30 PM to 8:30 PM throughout the year with Antillean dancers, drum music, cultural food and art.

Aruba Piano Festival
The Aruba Piano Festival occurs in September, and features world famous pianists. The festival has developed an international reputation for its distinguished artists across a range of chamber music styles. In addition to the core chamber concert series, the festival has a number of music and education components.

Soul Beach Music Festival
The Soul Beach Music Festival is a multi-night concert series held Memorial Day weekend. The attendees take part in nightclub events, beach parties, concerts, and comedy shows.

Aruba International Film Festival
The Aruba International Film Festival typically takes place over a week in June, bringing the international film community to Aruba. In 2011, over 45 films were featured from 18 countries and screened in 40 venues around the island.

Caribbean Sea Jazz Festival: Aruba
The Caribbean Sea Jazz Festival in Aruba is an outdoor festival featuring local and international jazz musicians. The festival presents local and international bands and artists over a two-day event in October. While jazz music is the focus, other artistic elements including dance, poetry, and art are also included in the program.

Dande Festival
The Dande Festival is one of the biggest musical events in Aruba, and takes place in the last week of December. The festival features over 50 singers performing their original music along with traditional Dande songs for the new year.

Carnival
Carnival is a month-long celebration. Activities in this festival include: music competition, pageants, and street parades. This celebration started in 1954 in Aruba.

References

External links
 Aruba Events and Festivals Official Aruba Tourism :Portal

 
Tourism in Aruba